Ingrandes is a former commune in the Maine-et-Loire department, Pays de la Loire, France. On 1 January 2016, it was merged into the new commune of Ingrandes-le-Fresne-sur-Loire.

See also
Communes of the Maine-et-Loire department

References

Former communes of Maine-et-Loire
Populated places disestablished in 2016